Ouzoud Falls (Amazigh: Imuzzar n wuẓuḍ) is the collective name for several waterfalls that empty into the El-Abid River's (Arabic for "Slaves' River") gorge. This popular tourism destination is located near the Middle Atlas village of Tanaghmeilt, in the province of Azilal, 150 km northeast of Marrakech, Morocco. 'Ouzoud' means "the act of grinding grain" in Berber. This seems to be confirmed by the frequent mills in the region.

The bottom of the falls is accessible through a shaded path of olive trees. At the summit of the falls, there are a dozen old small mills that are still in use. One can also follow a narrow and difficult track leading to the road of Beni Mellal. While descending the gorges from the "wadi el-Abid" in a canyon sometimes one does not distinguish the bottom which is nearly 600 metres down.

It is the most visited site of the region. In the vicinity, green valleys, mills, orchards and a superb circuit of the gorges of the El-Abid River are found. Many local and national associations lead projects to protect and preserve the site.

References

External links

Waterfalls of Morocco
Tiered waterfalls
Geography of Béni Mellal-Khénifra
Tourist attractions in Morocco